Bhuttiwala is a large village located in the Giddarbaha Tehsil of Sri Muktsar Sahib district of Eastern Punjab.

Villages in Sri Muktsar Sahib district